is a TV station affiliated with Nippon News Network (NNN) and Nippon Television Network System (NNS) in Niigata, Niigata.  It is broadcast in Niigata Prefecture. It was established on October 23, 1980 and began broadcasting from April 1, 1981. The station had been used the abbreviation TNN until 1998.

TV channel

Digital television 
 Yahiko 26ch JOPI-DTV 3 kW

Tandem office 
 Takada 31ch
 Mikawa 45ch
 Tsunan-Kamigō 25ch
 Koide 30ch 
 Kanose 26ch 
 Itoigawa-Ōno 25ch
 Tsunan 25ch
 Tsugawa 45ch
 Ryōtsu 37ch 
 Aikawa 32ch 
 Yamato 36ch 
 Takachi 26ch 
 Arai 47ch
 Murakami 31ch 
 Sotokaifu 32ch 
 Yuzawa 26ch
 Tsunan-Tanaka 26ch
 Itoigawa-Hayakawa 36ch
 Sumon 36ch
 Muramatsu 45ch
 Sekikawa 47ch
 Tochio 47ch
 Muikamachi 36ch  
 Myōkōkōgen 47ch
 Ōmi 32ch
 Takayanagi 39ch
 Kawaguchi 26ch

Program

Syndicated shows from the TX Network:
Pokémon
Naruto
Dawn of Nikkei Gaia Special
Hayate no Gotoku
D.Gray-man (season 1)
the Drama 24 anthology
KIRA KIRA AFRO (only season 1 was transmitted, produced by TV Osaka)

External links
 The official website of Television Niigata Network 
 Company Profile

Nippon News Network
Television stations in Japan
Television channels and stations established in 1981
Mass media in Niigata (city)
Companies based in Niigata Prefecture